Porter County Regional Airport  (formerly Porter County Municipal Airport) is a public use airport one mile (1.6 km) southeast of the central business district of Valparaiso, a city in Porter County, Indiana, United States. The Porter County Municipal Airport Authority owns the airport.

Facilities and aircraft 

It has two asphalt paved runways: 9/27 is 7,001 by 150 feet (2,134 x 46 m) and 18/36 is 4,001 by 75 feet (1,220 x 23 m).

For period ending December 31, 2013, the airport had 69,888 aircraft operations, an average of 191 per day: 97% general aviation, 2% air taxi and 1% military. In January 2017, there were 146 aircraft based at this airport: 128 single-engine, 7 multi-engine, 6 jet, 4 helicopter and 1 ultralight.

References

External links 
 Porter County Regional Airport, official site
 Aerial photo from Indiana Department of Transportation
 Aerial photo as of 11 April 1998 from USGS The National Map via MSR Maps
 

Airports in Indiana
Northwest Indiana
Transportation buildings and structures in Porter County, Indiana